Kathleen Kennedy (born June 5, 1953) is an American film producer and president of Lucasfilm. In 1981, she co-founded the production company Amblin Entertainment with Steven Spielberg and her husband Frank Marshall.

Her first film as a producer was E.T. the Extra-Terrestrial (1982). A decade later, again with Spielberg, she produced the Jurassic Park franchise, the first two of which became two of the top ten highest-grossing films of the 1990s. In 1992, she  The Kennedy/Marshall Company with her husband, Frank Marshall. On October 30, 2012, she became the president of Lucasfilm after The Walt Disney Company acquired the company for $4.2 billion. She received the Irving G. Thalberg Award from the Academy of Motion Picture Arts and Sciences in 2018.

Kennedy has participated in the making of over 60 films that have earned over $11 billion worldwide, including five of the fifty highest-grossing films in motion picture history. She has received eight Academy Award for Best Picture nominations, the third greatest number of nominations for the award behind Spielberg and Scott Rudin. As a producer, she is third behind Kevin Feige and Spielberg in domestic box office receipts, with over $7.5 billion .

Early life
Kennedy was born in Berkeley, California, to Dione Marie "Dede" (née Dousseau), a one-time theater actress, and Donald R. Kennedy, a judge and attorney. She has two sisters. Her twin sister, Connie, formerly a location manager in British Columbia, Canada, is now the executive producer of the Virtual Production company Profile Studios. Her other sister is Dana Middleton-Silberstein, a television host and anchor, and press secretary/communications director for former Governor Gary Locke (D-WA).

Kennedy graduated from Shasta High School in Redding, California, in 1971. She continued her education at San Diego State University where she majored in telecommunications and film. In her final year, Kennedy gained employment at a local San Diego TV station, KCST (now KNSD), taking on various roles including camera operator, video editor, floor director and finally as KCST news production coordinator.

After her employment with KCST, she produced a local talk show entitled You're On for the station for four years before moving to Los Angeles. In Los Angeles, Kennedy secured her first film production job working as an assistant to John Milius, who at the time was executive producer of Spielberg's 1941 (1979).

Film producer
While working under Milius during the production of 1941, Kennedy caught the attention of Steven Spielberg, who stated in 2015:She was horrible at taking notes... but what she did know how to do was interrupt somebody in midsentence. We'd be pitching ideas back and forth, and Kathy—who was supposed to be writing these ideas down—suddenly put her pencil down and would say something like, "And what if he didn't get the girl, but instead he got the dog?"Spielberg asked Kennedy to become his secretary for her organization abilities, and Kennedy gradually took on larger roles in the moviemaking process. Kennedy was credited as associate to Spielberg on Raiders of the Lost Ark (1981), then associate producer on Spielberg's production of Tobe Hooper's Poltergeist (1982).

Kennedy began receiving producer credit with Spielberg on the major box-office hit E.T. the Extra-Terrestrial (1982), and continued serving the role on most of his films for the next three decades. In 1982, she helped  and run the production company Amblin Entertainment with Spielberg and her future husband Frank Marshall. She also produced Indiana Jones and the Temple of Doom (1984) with George Lucas and Marshall, and appeared in the film's opening sequence as a dancer. Following her work on the Indiana Jones films, she rose to become one of Hollywood's leading producers. With Amblin, she produced the Back to the Future trilogy, collaborating with such directors as Martin Scorsese, Robert Zemeckis, Barry Levinson, and Clint Eastwood. In 1991, she and Marshall formed The Kennedy/Marshall Company with a deal at DreamWorks. She continued her business relationship with Spielberg and became producer for Jurassic Park (1993) and executive producer for the historical drama Schindler's List (also 1993).

During the 1980s and 1990s, Kennedy served on the advisory board of the National Student Film Institute and in 1991 was a "Grimmy Award" recipient in recognition for her outstanding support of student film making. Kennedy was also an Honorary Chairperson of the institute. In 1995, she was awarded the Women in Film Crystal Award for outstanding women who, through their endurance and the excellence of their work, have helped to expand the role of women within the entertainment industry. In 1996, she and Frank Marshall received the American Academy of Achievement's Golden Plate Award. For the 2001–02 period, she was co-president (with Tim Gibbons) of the Producers Guild of America. In 2007, Kennedy was the first recipient of Women in Film's Paltrow Mentorship Award, for showing extraordinary commitment to mentoring and supporting the next generation of filmmakers and executives.

Kennedy was a producer on Spielberg's films: War of the Worlds and Munich (both 2005), the latter of which earned her an Academy Award nomination. Marshall and Kennedy were producers for the US versions of two Studio Ghibli animated features Ponyo (2009) and The Secret World of Arrietty (2012). She also produced Spielberg's Lincoln (2012), which was nominated for seven Golden Globes and twelve Academy Awards.

In May 2012, she stepped down from Kennedy/Marshall, leaving Marshall as sole principal of their film company. In the following month, Kennedy became co-chair of Lucasfilm Ltd. alongside George Lucas. On October 30, 2012, when Lucas sold his company to Disney, Kennedy was promoted to president. In 2018, Kennedy's contract to remain president of Lucasfilm was extended another three years, through October 30, 2021.

In 2019, Kennedy was appointed an honorary commander of the Order of the British Empire, for services to film production in the United Kingdom. In that same year, it was announced that she would receive the BAFTA Fellowship in 2020.

Filmography

Film

Television

References

External links

 

1953 births
Living people
American film producers
American film studio executives
American women in film
American women film producers
Disney people
Disney executives
Businesspeople from Berkeley, California
San Diego State University alumni
Fellows of the American Academy of Arts and Sciences
Lucasfilm people
American twins
Honorary Commanders of the Order of the British Empire